The Rohrbaugh R9 was a semi-automatic pistol produced by Rohrbaugh Firearms of Long Island, New York. It was chambered in 9×19mm Parabellum, and was designed to be a lightweight, compact self-defense weapon.  The R9 was rated for standard pressure 9mm ammunition.  Firing +P or +P+ ammunition in the R9 was not recommended by the manufacturer. The Rohrbaugh R9 Series Pistol was the NRA "Shooting Illustrated" magazines "Handgun of the Year" for 2005.

The Rohrbaugh R9 had no manual safety, locking slide, or magazine disconnect; the weapon could be fired with no magazine inserted.  It had  no sharp exterior edges or protrusions.

Variants
The R9s variant offered sights. In addition, there were Stealth versions of both the R9 and R9s that had blued slides instead of the standard stainless steel slide.  A rare 'Covert' version of the R9, similar in appearance to the Stealth, was also offered with additional improvements provided by Wilson Combat featuring Wilson's Armor-Tuff finish applied to the entire firearm including the barrel.

There were 16 special pistols manufactured called:  The "Elite Premium" model, which came with a custom made walnut display presentation case with glass top with the Rohrbaugh Family Crest etched into the glass in the lower right hand corner. These were numbered:  1 of 16, 2 of 16, 3 of 16, etc.

Rohrbaugh Firearms also made the Rohrbaugh 380, identical in size and weight to the R9 but chambered in 380 ACP. The R9 and all of its variants had a 'European-style' magazine release at the base of the grip.

The R9 weighed 13.5 ounces empty, the six-round magazine weighed 1.6 ounces empty.  The R9 weighed approximately 18 ounces fully loaded with 7 rounds (magazine loaded with six rounds inserted in the pistol and one round loaded in the chamber).

Rohrbaugh Firearms Corp. was sold in January 2014 to Remington Outdoor Company, Inc.

References

External links

Rohrbaugh R9
Instruction manual
Rohrbaugh R9 Facts and FAQ's FAQ site
Unofficial Rohrbaugh Firearms forum 
Hi-Powers and Hand Guns review
American Rifleman review

9mm Parabellum semi-automatic pistols
.380 ACP semi-automatic pistols
Semi-automatic pistols of the United States